Abd al-Malik ibn Rabi was among the narrators of hadith.

name
He was the son of Rabi ibn Sabra, and reported the hadith of Sabra reporting on the prohibition of Mut'ah on his fathers authority. Although this hadith qualified into Sahih Muslim, some have questioned his reliability as a narrator.

Legacy

Sunni view
 states:

References

Taba‘ at-Tabi‘in hadith narrators
8th-century Arabs